Microtropis wallichiana is a species of small tree in the family Celastraceae. It is native to India and Sri Lanka.  Its leaves are simple, opposite, decussate, and estipulate. The tree is about 15m high. Branchlets are yellowish in mature trees and darker in the youngest. The fruit is a capsule, 1-seeded; flowers are bisexual with 5 petals. Flowering and fruiting occur in December and January.

References

External links
 jstor.otg

Flora of India (region)
Flora of Sri Lanka
wallichiana
Plants described in 1858